SAMSON AG, founded in 1907 by Hermann Sandvoss, is a German corporation headquartered in Frankfurt. It develops systems and products that can control all types of fluid. Its product line includes valves, self-operating regulators, automation systems, sensors, thermostats, and digital devices, among others.

Background 
SAMSON was founded in 1907 after Sandvoss invented a regulator that can function without an external power supply. The device automatically controls processes by utilizing differences in pressure. By 1916, its main manufacturing facility and headquarters were relocated to Frankfurt's River Main.

Aside from regulators, SAMSON AG develops measurement and control technologies such as control valves, and electro-pneumatic transducers, control valves for HVAC systems - controllers and sensors for HVAC systems. The control valves have modular designs, giving it flexibility in terms of usage in engineering and building automation processes. The range of products in these areas cover chemical, petrochemical, pulp and paper, power, HVAC and food and beverage industries. In 2002, the sales of its products reached $317 million.

Today, SAMSON operates in over 40 countries with more than 4,500 employees and more than 50 subsidiaries, more than 200 engineering and service centers worldwide.

Products
SAMSON manufactures and supplies control valves, regulators and accessories for process control. Majors products are:

 Control valves
 Positioners, limit switches, accessories
 Measuring and control equipment
 Control valves for HVAC systems
 Controllers and sensors for HVAC systems

Additionally, SAMSON AG and its associated companies AIR TORQUE S.p.A., CERA SYSTEM Verschleißschutz GmbH, KT-Elektronik GmbH, LEUSCH GmbH Industriearmaturen, Pfeiffer Chemie-Armaturenbau GmbH, RINGO VÁLVULAS S.L., SED FLow Control GmbH, STARLINE S.p.A., and VETEC Ventiltechnik GmbH offer technologies for severe requirements: e.g. abrasive and contaminated fluids, high shutdown pressures, lowest interior and exterior leak rates, quick-action, on-off, and control functions, as well as alloys like Monel, Hastelloy, titanium, zirconium, duplex, etc.

Board of directors
Andreas Widl (CEO) Chairman of the executive board, Thomas Steckenreiter (CTO) Vice Chairman of the executive board, Dominic Deller (CFO)

Chairman of the Board: Nikolaus Hensel

References

Manufacturing companies based in Frankfurt